Chief Mouser to the Cabinet Office is the title of the official resident cat at 10 Downing Street, the residence and executive office of the prime minister of the United Kingdom in London. There has been a resident cat in the British government employed as a mouser and pet since the 16th century, although modern records date only to the 1920s. Despite other cats having served Downing Street, the first one to be given the official title of Chief Mouser by the British government was Larry in 2011. Other cats have been given this title affectionately, usually by the British press. 

In 2004, a study was conducted showing that voters' perceptions of the Chief Mouser were not completely above partisanship.

History
There is evidence of a cat in residence in the English government dating back to the reign of Henry VIII, when Cardinal Thomas Wolsey placed his cat by his side while acting in his judicial capacity as Lord Chancellor. Official records, however, released into the public domain on 4 January 2005 as part of the Freedom of Information Act 2000 only date back to 3 June 1929, when A.E. Banham at the Treasury authorised the Office Keeper "to spend 1d a day from petty cash towards the maintenance of an efficient cat". In April 1932, the weekly allowance was increased to 1s 6d. By the 21st century, the mouser was costing £100 per annum. The cats do not necessarily belong to the Prime Minister in residence, and it is rare for the Chief Mouser's term of office to coincide with that of a Prime Minister. The cat with the longest known tenure at Downing Street is Wilberforce, who served under four different Prime Ministers: Edward Heath, Harold Wilson, Jim Callaghan, and Margaret Thatcher.

The post has been held by Larry since 2011, the first to be given the title officially. The departure of the previous incumbent, Sybil, was in January 2009. Sybil, who began her tenure on 11 September 2007, was the first mouser for ten years following the retirement of her predecessor Humphrey in 1997. Sybil was owned by the then Chancellor of the Exchequer, Alistair Darling, who lived in 10 Downing Street while the then Prime Minister, Gordon Brown, lived in the larger 11 Downing Street. It was reported that Sybil did not stay in London, and was returned to Scotland to live with a friend of the Darlings. Sybil died on 27 July 2009.

In January 2011, rats were seen in Downing Street, "scurrying across the steps of Number 10 Downing Street for the second time during a TV news report," according to ITN. There being no incumbent Chief Mouser at that time, the Prime Minister's spokesman said there were "no plans" for a cat to be brought in to tackle the problem; however, the following day, newspapers reported that the spokesman had said there was a "pro-cat faction" within Downing Street, leading to speculation that a replacement might indeed be brought in to deal with the problem. On 14 February 2011, it was reported that a cat called "Larry" had been brought in to address the problem. The London Evening Standard reported that the cat had been selected by David Cameron and his family, from those at Battersea Dogs & Cats Home.

Chief Mousers in the past have overlapped, or been phased in, though the position can and has remained vacant for extended periods of time.  Larry is the only Chief Mouser listed on the official website for Number 10.

Partisanship study
In 2004, Robert Ford, a political scientist at the University of Manchester, reported on a YouGov survey on partisan reactions to the Downing Street cats. Participants in the survey were shown a picture of Humphrey, the Chief Mouser appointed by Margaret Thatcher, and told that he was either Thatcher's cat or Tony Blair's cat. Affinity for the cat divided along partisan lines: Conservative voters liked the cat far more when they were told he was Thatcher's and Labour voters liked the cat far more when they were told he was Blair's. Ford concludes that partisanship shapes reactions to everything a politician does, however trivial, similar to the halo effect (and a reverse "forked tail effect") observed by psychologists.

List of Chief Mousers

See also
 Palmerston (cat), former Chief Mouser to the Foreign & Commonwealth Office
 Gladstone (cat), Chief Mouser to HM Treasury since 2016
 Tibs the Great, the British Post Office's former "number one cat"
 Canadian Parliamentary Cats
 Pets of Vladimir Putin
 United States presidential pets

Notes

References

Further reading

External links
 Gov.UK Prime Minister
 10 Downing Street official website
 Official Chief Mouser Page at 10 Downing Street Web Site

 
British civil servants
Cabinet Office (United Kingdom)
Cats in the United Kingdom
Individual cats in politics
Mammal pest control
Political history of the United Kingdom
Working cats
10 Downing Street